The Soninke share a very conservative culture, inherited by the structural social organization from their forefather founders of the Ghana Empire (not to be confused with modern-day Ghana, which adopted its name). This empire constituted the major part of the Soninke history and lifestyle.

Oral tradition on the fall of the Ghana Empire 
The first ruler of this empire was said by Sonnike Griots to be Dingha Cisse, who it is said had a semi-divine status. He was sometimes said to have come with his people from "the East", Aswan, Egypt, Mali, or from what is modern day Senegal, and created a coalition against the neighboring tribes and “nomadic raiders”. 

Oral tradition in the legend of Wagadu says that after Cisse's death, his two sons, Khine and Dyabe, disagreed about who would become the successor. They fought and Khine won the battle. Dyabe, humiliated, made an accord with a black snake with seven heads named Bida. Dyabe promised to sacrifice a virgin to the snake once every year in return for victory over his brother. He fulfilled his promise to Bida until his death. The wealth of Ghana is depicted by this story, as the Soninke believe that there were rains of gold due to the annual virgin girl sacrifice to the black snake. Another clarification to the prosperity of the empire was its gold mines located in Kumbi Saleh, the imperial capital. This place became an important commercial centre. The existence of camels facilitated the transport of gold and other products, such as slaves, salt and copper, textiles, beads, and finished goods, with the rest of the world.

With the amplitude of trade, Islam was adopted throughout the empire. However, the king continued to follow his cultural beliefs. Twelve mosques were built, and Islamic schools. Some Arab historians relate the decline of the Empire to the attack of Almoravid who came to convert the empire into Islam, but others believe the power of Islam was slow and did not engage any assault. There are many explanations about what led to the decline of the empire. One fact is that the king lost his trading monopoly. Also, drought began to have a long-term effect on the land, ruining its ability to sustain cattle and cultivation. New gold fields began mining, for example, at Bure (modern Guinea) which was out of reach for Ghana and new trade routes were opening up further east and across the Atlantic.

For the Soninke people, the decline of their empire was due to the legend of Wagadu and the rupture of the pact between the empire and the black snake. This happened after the nobles chose Siya Yatabare as the annual sacrifice. She was the most beautiful and “cleanest” virgin girl in that year, but she was also engaged to be married. Her fiancé, Maadi, was the son of Djamere Soukhounou whose unique quality was that he always did what he promised. When Maadi was told him what would happen, that his fiancée would be given to “Bida” - the black snake of Wagadu, he promised Siya that she would not die in the well of Wagadu.

Siya tried to convince him that it is her destiny, that he should let her to be the gift to the snake in order to save the Empire, but Maadi refused. Within days, he asked his friend, the blacksmith of his village named Bomou, to sharpen his saber. When the day came, Maadi set on his way in the direction of the well of Wagadu. Siya Yatabare was well dressed and her hairstyle was in plaited with gold. The praise-singer encouraged her, as did her family. When they left, she saw Maadi and they both fell in tears. Siya told him that if he killed the snake, Wagadu would not have any more rain and the empire would be destroyed forever. Maadi refused, saying their destinies are ratified. He left her and hid himself nearby to wait for the snake.

The snake of Wagadu had seven heads. When the snake took out his first head, Maadi cut it. He did the same to all the others. When the snake took out his last head, the one in silver, the night became clear like the day. The snake said, “I swear by the lord of seven head, during seven years and seven bad years, and during seven months and seven bad months, during seven days and seven bad days, Wagadu will not receive any rain and any piece of gold”. Maadi did not mind, and cut the last head. The snake died. Maadi gave to Siya his shoes, the sheath of his saber, his ring, his “danan koufoune” cap. He told her that, if tomorrow they ask you some clarifications, give them those things. Maadi went to his village and told all the details to his mother. She said “you are my only son and it is because of your fiancée that you killed the “Bida”, however, the nobles of Wagadu will try to punish you. I swear in the memory of your father that I will do everything to protect you from Wagadu.”

When the sun came up, the nobles asked the praise-singer to go check the well of Wagadu. When they saw Siya, and the heads of the snake in the well, they asked her what happened. As an answer, she gave them the shoes and all the things that Maadi gave her. The nobles of the 99 villages called everybody to come and try to wear the articles of clothing. When Maadi wore the shoes, the bonnet and the ring, everything fit. People knew that he killed the snake. They were going to take him when his mother intervened and said: “I thought there were men in Wagadu, but I do not see any. You are afraid of the prediction of the snake even before you die. But there is something sure, nobody will kill my son because of a snake. I do not see any men here. You will know that my loincloth is better than all your trousers accumulated here. During those seven bad years and seven bad months and seven bad days, the needs of wagadu would be in my charge as an exchange of my son’s life and his marriage with Siya Yatabare.”

With shame, the notables of Wagadu concluded the agreement. After Djamere Shoukhouna died, the nobles of Wagadu met and decided that she did what she promised and the agreement was at end and the destiny  of the nation would be accomplished. Wagadu went from fertile to dry, and there was no more rain. The children of Dingha, the Soninke, were forced to leave that place which became inhospitable. Thus every family went to his destiny that is the decline of the Ghana Empire - the end of the Soninke Empire.

Guidimakha 
Empire Soninke is located today in Mauritania, Senegal and Mali. The empire was founded by the Soumare family. From the only daughter of the king of Ghana empire, came Demba, son of the great warrior Mamoudou Diafara. Demba governed Ghana under his grandfather. The fifth generation, Makha Malle Doua Soumare founded the Guidimakha which means the mountains of Makha Malle in the Soninke language.

The Camara of Guidimakha’ story one of the Soninke tribes
Mr Camara Yelli, one of the inhabitants of Haourou a village in Guidimakha told me February 25, 2006 that Soundiata Keita the emperor of the Manding in Mali wanted to have the city of Boli in his empire. He promised to all the warriors of his empire that the person who will help him conquer the city of Boly will have anything he wants from him. Gane, the ancestor of the Camara of Guidimakha, was the strongest warrior of Soundiata Keita Empire. Gane went with his army to the city of Boly he won the battle. He killed the king of Boly cut his head and put it in his bag. He brought it to Sundiata Keita as a proof of his victory. So the city of Boly became a part of Soundiata Keita Empire. He was very happy and wanted to reward his warrior Gane. He told him in front of all his court come tomorrow at early morning I will give to you anything you want that you have seen in my kingdom. This is the big promise that the emperor Soundiata Keita made to Gane. Tekhaye Kante the youngest wife of Soundiata heard it. As she loved Gane she dressed herself as new bride and sat early in the morning in the middle of the royal court. Soundiata Keita, Gane and the royal court met at this time at the place convened. When Gane saw her, he thought that it was the gift the emperor promised him and thanked Soundiata keita. As an emperor a parole is sacred so he agreed to give to Gane in marriage his wife Tekhaye Kante. However Soundiata Keita was so furious and humiliated and Tekhaye Kante knew it. She advised to her new husband Gane to desert the Soundiata Keita Empire. Gane followed his wife's advice and left with her and his friends Barri, Gassama, Dagnokho. When they arrived in a village away from Soundiata Keita's empire, he left his companions and his wife with the chief of that village named Sylla. He went hunting. During his absence, Soundiata Keita's army came and fought with the sylla in order to bring back with them Tekhaye Kante the ex-wife of the emperor. The sylla won the battle and soon Soundiata's army went back without Gane's companions. When Gane came back from hunting he took his companions and left the sylla's village in order to prevent their hosts from any attack of Soundiata Keita. On the road to Guidimakha he met a cisse and they became friends, continuing the journey together. They arrived to a mountain and found there a king named Magha Soumare. They continued by foot to the top of the mountain. For the warriors of that time, music would be made to let the king know about their presence. He knew that Gane was a strong warrior. The soumare were farmers and they needed protection against the Berbers of Mauritania. Gane agreed to help to protect them. Magha Soumare gave a part of his kingdom  to Gane will dominate  thus he asked Gane to promise him that the kingdom will take his name. He gave his daughter in marriage to Gane as an alliance. After his death Gane dominated a part of the kingdom but he did what he promised. He named it “Guidimakha” which means the "Mountain of Makha". The  Guidimakha  is located in the southern Mauritania and the northern Mali.

See also
Ghana Empire
Kaya Magan Cissé

References

History of Mali
History of Ivory Coast
History of Mauritania
History of Guinea-Bissau
History of Guinea
History of Senegal
History of the Gambia